Dahlica charlottae is a moth belonging to the family Psychidae. The species was first described by Herbert Meier in 1957.

It is native to Europe.

References

External links
Original description: Nachrichtenblatt der Bayerischen Entomologen 

Psychidae
Moths described in 1957